Ilya Trauberg (Ilya Zakharovich Trauberg) was a Russian director born in Odessa on December 13, 1905, who died in Berlin on December 18, 1948.

Filmography

Assistant director 
 1927 - October: Ten Days That Shook the World

Director 
 1927 : Léningrad aujourd'hui - Documentaire
 1929 : The Blue Express ou Le Train mongol (Goluboy ekspress)
 1932 : Nous travaillons pour vous (Dlya vas naydyotsya rabota)
 1934 : Chastnyy sluchay
 1936 : Son of Mongolia (Mongol Khüü ou Syn Mongolii)
 1938 : God devyatnadtsatyy
 1941 : My zhdem vas s pobedoy
 1941 : Kontsert-vals
 1942 : Boyevoy kinosbornik 11

Screenwriter 
 1929 : The Blue Express ou Le Train mongol (Goluboy ekspress)
 1932 : Nous travaillons pour vous (Dlya vas naydyotsya rabota)
 1934 : Chastnyy sluchay
 1938 : God devyatnadtsatyy
 1941 : Kontsert-vals

External links

1905 births
1948 deaths
Soviet film directors
Soviet expatriates in Germany